The Masovian Voivodeship Sejmik is the regional legislature of the Voivodeship of Masovia in Poland. It is a unicameral parliamentary body consisting of fifty-one councillors, making it the largest provincial assembly in the republic. All councillors are chosen during regional elections for a five-year term. The current chairperson of the legislature is Ludwik Rakowski of the KO.

The assembly elects the executive board that acts as the collective executive for the provincial government, headed by the voivodeship marshal. The current Executive Board of Masovia is a coalition government between the Civic Coalition and Polish People's Party under the leadership of Marshal Adam Struzik of the PSL.

The assembly convenes at the Palace of the Treasury Minister in Warsaw.

Districts 
Members of the Assembly are elected from five districts, serve five-year terms. Districts does not have the constituencies formal names. Instead, each constituency has a number and territorial description.

Composition

1998

2002

2006

2010

2014

2018

See also 
 Polish Regional Assembly
 Masovian Voivodeship

References

External links 
 Masovian Regional Assembly
 Executive Board of Masovia

Masovian
Assembly
Unicameral legislatures